Vanity Street is a 1932 American Pre-Code crime drama film directed by Nick Grinde and starring Charles Bickford, Helen Chandler and Mayo Methot.

A New York policeman assists a down-on-her-luck showgirl, helping her get a job at the Follies. The two fall in love and plan to get married, when he finds himself arresting her for a murder he knows she did not commit. He sets out to clear her by finding the real killer.

Cast

References

Bibliography
 Ian Scott. In Capra's Shadow: The Life and Career of Screenwriter Robert Riskin. University Press of Kentucky, 2015.

External links

1932 films
American crime drama films
American black-and-white films
1932 crime drama films
1930s English-language films
Films directed by Nick Grinde
Columbia Pictures films
Films set in New York City
1930s American films